Minister for Foreign Affairs of Gabon is a government minister in charge of the Ministry for Foreign Affairs of Gabon, responsible for conducting foreign relations of the country.

The following is a list of foreign ministers of Gabon since its founding in 1960:

Notes

References

Foreign
Foreign Ministers
Politicians
Foreign ministers of Gabon
Foreign ministers